Maxwell William Ward  (22 November 1921 – 2 November 2020) was a Canadian aviator and founder of Wardair Airlines, at one time the third-largest air carrier in Canada.

Early years
Ward was born 22 November 1921 in Edmonton, Alberta. After completing Grade 11 at Victoria High School in Edmonton, and working at the Canadian National Railways, he joined the Royal Canadian Air Force (RCAF) in 1940.

Aviation career
During the Second World War, Ward received his wings on 2 November 1941 and was assigned to training command as an instructor as part of the British Commonwealth Air Training Plan. He was stationed at various training bases for the duration of the war. While in Regina, he married Marjorie Doretha Skelton in 1944.

In 1946, after leaving the air force, Ward worked at a few other jobs before joining with Jack Moar, who was flying out of Yellowknife, Northwest Territories. Wishing to start a flying service to the north, Ward purchased a small de Havilland Fox Moth biplane to carry both passengers and freight and started his first company, Polaris Charter Company. When he was unable to obtain a commercial flying license on his own, he found a partner in George Pigeon and established Yellowknife Airways on a 50-50 basis, each contributing one aircraft. The skirmish with bureaucracy was the first of many that punctuated Ward's aviation career. This was a short-lived operation that was dissolved in 1949 when Pigeon sold his part of the company forcing Ward to pay off his assets.

After two years in Alberta, including flying for Associated Airways, Ward worked in construction before returning in 1951 to Yellowknife to work for Associated Airways, but he lost his job the next year.

Wardair
After flying as a charter pilot for two years, the opportunity arose to get a license for Ward to operate his own commercial air service. With this Class 4B Charter license and a brand new de Havilland Canada DHC-3 Otter single-engine prop aircraft, Wardair was formed in May 1953.

Wardair operated within Canada until the 1960s when Ward started looking at overseas charter as a business opportunity. He took Wardair public in 1961 but retained a controlling interest. By the mid-1970s, Wardair Canada had developed into Canada's largest international air charter carrier and from 1984 flew scheduled routes. After another 20 years of economic rollercoasters, competition from the likes of Air Canada and Canadian Pacific Airlines and government regulation, Ward finally sold Wardair in 1989 to PWA International, the parent company of Pacific Western Airlines, which had also acquired CP Air.  Wardair then became part of the new Canadian Airlines which operated as Canadian Airlines International.

In 1991, Ward published his autobiography, The Max Ward Story.

Awards and honours
 International Northwest Aviation Council – Billy Mitchell Award, 1971
 Order of Icarus, 1973
 Trans-Canada Trophy (McKee Trophy), 1973
 Canada's Aviation Hall of Fame, 1974
 Officer of the Order of Canada, 1975
 Alberta Order of Excellence, 1989
 Canadian Business Hall of Fame, 1993
Canadian Travel Hall of Fame, 2018

References
Notes

Bibliography

 Hotson, Fred W. The de Havilland Canada Story. Toronto: CANAV Books, 1983. .
 McCaffery, Dan. Bush Planes and Bush Pilots. Toronto: Lorimer, 2003. .
 McCartney, Denny. Picking Up The Pieces. Bloomington, Indiana: Trafford Publishing, 2006. .
 Szurovy, Geza. Bushplanes. Minneapolis, Minnesota: Zenith Press, 2004. .
 Ward, Max. The Max Ward Story: A Bush Pilot in the Bureaucratic Jungle. Toronto: McClelland & Stewart, First edition 1991. .

External links 
 Life and Times - Max Ward cbc.ca
 Max Ward, a 1984 National Film Board of Canada documentary (Requires Adobe Flash) 
 Maxwell (Max) William Ward Flight Deck - Great Aviators
 Max Ward at the Alberta Order of Excellence

1921 births
2020 deaths
Aviation history of Canada
Bush pilots
Canadian aviators
Canadian World War II pilots
Members of the Alberta Order of Excellence
Officers of the Order of Canada
People from Edmonton
Royal Canadian Air Force officers